Eternia (born May 13, 1980) is a Canadian rapper who has released several albums of hip-hop music.

Early life
Eternia was born Silk-Anne Semiramis Dawn Craig Kaya in Ottawa, Ontario. Growing up in a musical family, she learned to play piano, flute and classical guitar. She left home and dropped out of high school at age 15. After travelling around and becoming involved with the hip-hop scene, she returned to complete high school and then enrolled in a journalism course in Toronto.

Career
Eternia released her first full-length album, It's Called Life in 2005. It was subsequently nominated for Best Rap Recording of the Year at the 2006 Juno Awards. She has performed on the Van's Warped Tour, as well as at SXSW and NXNE.

Her 2010 album At Last (Fat Beats Records), a collaboration with producer MoSS, was named as a longlisted nominee for the 2011 Polaris Music Prize.  At Last also brought Eternia her second Juno Award nomination for Rap Recording of the Year in 2011. Eternia and MoSS released a single, "Day and Night", in 2016; that year she also released the solo single "Keep U".

In 2013 Eternia performed on the track "Love Means", part of Shad's album Flying Colours.

Eternia is managed by Graig 'Sav' Stanton, of The Newprint.

Discography
Studio albums
 It's Called Life (2005)
 At Last (with MoSS, 2010)
 Free (with Rel McCoy, 2021)

Mixtapes
 Where I Been – The Collection (2005)
 Where I'm At – The Setup (2007)
 Get Caught Up (2009)

References

External links 
 

21st-century Canadian rappers
Canadian women rappers
Musicians from Ottawa
Living people
1981 births
21st-century women rappers